Carex spicata is a species of sedge in the genus Carex.

Description

C. spicata differs from the other species in Carex section Phaestoglochin by the presence of a purple pigment in the roots, leaf sheaths and bracts.

Distribution and ecology
Carex spicata has a European temperate distribution, although it has been extensively naturalised outside this native range.

Carex spicata is usually found in grassland (usually in British NVC community MG10 in the British Isles), on roadsides, and in waste ground. It is found on heavy, slightly base-rich soils, and cannot tolerate much competition.

Taxonomy
Carex spicata was first described by the English botanist William Hudson in his 1762 work Flora Anglica.

It is known in the British Isles as "spiked sedge", in North America as "spicate sedge" or "prickly sedge".

Few hybrids have been reported between C. spicata and other members of Carex sect. Phaestoglochin, but hybrids have been reported between C. spicata and C. otrubae, and between C. spicata and C. echinata.

References

External links
Carex spicata Hudson, Fl. Angl. 349. 1762., Flora of North America
Carex spicata Huds., University of Michigan Herbarium
Carex spicata, "The Plants of Pennsylvania"
Carex spicata, "The History of the British Flora"

spicata
Flora of Europe
Plants described in 1762
Taxa named by William Hudson (botanist)